Nina Wilson (born 10 August 1999), also known by her stage name Ninajirachi, is an Australian electronic DJ and producer. She achieved breakthrough success with her 2017 single "Pure Luck" featuring Freya Staer, which received high rotation on triple j. Nina was a finalist in triple j’s Unearthed High competition in both 2016 and 2017.  In 2021, her collaborative EP True North with Kota Banks was named the 8th best album of the year by The Atlantic.

Discography

Mix Tape
Second Nature (2022)

Extended plays
Lapland (2019) 
Blumiere (2020)
True North (with Kota Banks) (2020)

Singles
"Pure Luck" (feat. Freya Staer) (2017)
"Same World" (2017)
"Warm Fire Lightning" (2018)
"Pathetic" (2018)
"Gardenia" (2018)
"Water Gun/Stingray" (2019)
"Blumiere" (2020)
"Cut The Rope" (2020)
"Dracodraco" (2021)
"Start Small" (2022)
"Petroleum" (2022)
"One Long Firework in the Sky" (with Montaigne)
"Crush Me" (feat. Kota Banks)

Features
"Thursdays" - Nina Las Vegas (2018)
"Everything We Ever Dreamed Of" - Nina Las Vegas, Kota Banks & KLP (2019)
"Prosperity" - Laces (2021)
"Vibrate" - Oh Boy (2021)
"Winx Club" - Oh Boy & Cult Shotta

Remixes
"Arty Boy" - Flight Facilities (2017)
"Waste Time" - Kilter (2017)
"303" - Anna Lunoe (2019)
"Pomegranate" - deadmau5 & The Neptunes (2020)
"Diva" - Princess Nokia (2022)
"Keep Me Safe" - Cub Sport (2023)

References

Australian DJs
Living people
1999 births
Women DJs
21st-century Australian musicians
21st-century women musicians